The Baby is a 1973 American psychological thriller film directed by Ted Post and written by Abe Polsky. The film stars Anjanette Comer, Ruth Roman, Marianna Hill, Suzanne Zenor, and David Manzy. It tells the story of a social worker who investigates an eccentric family which includes "Baby", a 21-year-old man who acts like an infant. The film is considered a cult classic.

Plot 
Ann Gentry is a social worker wracked with guilt about a severe car accident with serious repercussions for her husband. She is assigned to a new case: the eccentric and mysterious Wadsworth family. She quickly reveals that she has a special interest in the family's youngest member, a seemingly mentally impaired adult man in his 20s who does not have a name and is called only "Baby." Mrs. Wadsworth has been extremely overprotective of him ever since his father left, shortly after his birth; she will not let another caregiver interfere. The family's life revolves around Baby's care and they are dependent upon Baby's disability payments as their main source of income.

Ann wants to work with Baby, who still acts and is treated like an infant by his mother and two sisters, thinking that with the proper treatment he might begin to behave more appropriately for his age group. She soon discovers that Baby's infant-like state is not caused by any physical or mental conditions but because of the Wadsworth clan's profound neglect and abuse. Baby is never permitted to speak, walk or do things for himself and is forced to both wear and use diapers. He is punished by being beaten or restrained, and is even shocked with an electric cattle prod whenever he attempts to try to break out of the baby role. Baby has been forced to remain in his state of perpetual dependency and infantilism since his actual infancy.

The Wadsworths finally grow tired of Ann's meddling and try to dispose of her during a party, but Ann manages to escape, stealing Baby. Ann keeps Baby in her care at her house rather than turning him over to a professional facility. Eventually, goaded by pictures that Ann sent of Baby doing "adult" things such as standing, the Wadsworths break in to Ann's home with murderous intent. They fail to steal Baby back, however, as Ann—with the help of her mother-in-law—kills them all. She stabs Baby's two sisters, then buries Mrs. Wadsworth alive (alongside the corpses of her daughters) beneath the floor of a swimming pool that Ann had been building in her yard.

In the end, Ann's interests in obtaining Baby are revealed to have not been as pure-hearted as they seemed. Now that she has him, she no longer wants to rescue or rehabilitate him; she sought him only so he could be a playmate for her husband, who was left with the mental capacity of an infant after his accident. Thus, under Ann's care, Baby will remain trapped in his state of dependency and infancy, but under the kinder care of Ann and her mother-in-law, with Ann's husband as his "brother."

Cast 
 Anjanette Comer as Ann Gentry
 Ruth Roman as Mrs. Wadsworth
 Marianna Hill as Germaine Wadsworth
 Suzanne Zenor as Alba Wadsworth
 Tod Andrews as Doctor
 Michael Pataki as Dennis
 Beatrice Manley Blau as Judith
 Erin O'Reilly as Babysitter
 Don Mallon as Roger
 Joseph Bernard
 Virginia Vincent
 David Mooney (credited as David Manzy) as Baby

Release 
Scotia International released the film in March 1973 in a limited theatrical release. Image Entertainment released the film in 2000 on VHS and DVD.

The Baby was released on Blu-ray and DVD with a transfer from the original negative by Severin Films in 2011. It was then released again by Arrow Films in 2018.

Reception 

On Rotten Tomatoes, the film holds an approval rating of 93%, based on 15 reviews, with a weighted average rating of 7.26/10.

TV Guide awarded the film three out of five stars, calling it "Competently directed", and stated "despite its occasional lapses into genuine bad taste is fairly effective and contains a truly surprising twist ending." Dennis Schwartz from Ozus' World Movie Reviews rated the film a grade B, stating that the film managed to hold attention throughout its duration, and contained a genuinely surprising twist ending, but criticized the film's performances as being "over-the-top", as well as its use of footage of mentally disabled children for exploitation. Brett Gallman from Oh the Horror commended the film's strong performances, twist ending, and genuinely disturbing scenes; while criticizing the film for being "plodding and listless".

See also 
 List of American films of 1973

References

External links 
 
 
 
 

1973 films
1973 horror films
1973 independent films
1970s psychological thriller films
American horror thriller films
American independent films
1970s English-language films
Films directed by Ted Post
Films set in Los Angeles
Films about child abuse
Films scored by Gerald Fried
1970s American films